This is a list of dinner theaters. Dinner theater (sometimes called "dinner and a show") is a form of entertainment that combines a restaurant meal with a staged play or musical. Sometimes the play is incidental entertainment, secondary to the meal, in the style of a sophisticated night club or the play may be a major production with dinner less important and in some cases it is optional. Dinner theater requires the management of three distinct entities: a live theater, a restaurant, and usually a bar.

Dinner theaters

 Alhambra Dinner Theatre – Jacksonville, Florida
 Australian Outback Spectacular – Australian chain of theme restaurants
 Battle of the Dance – Anaheim, California (defunct)
 BDT Stage (Boulder’s Dinner Theatre) – Boulder, Colorado Formed in 1977, a playhouse that puts on Broadway-type shows while supplying eats from around the world.
 Beef & Boards Dinner Theatre – Indianapolis, Indiana (since 1973)
 Candlelight Dinner Playhouse – Johnstown, Colorado
 Chanhassen Dinner Theatres – Chanhassen, Minnesota (since 1968)
 Country Dinner Playhouse – Greenwood Village, Colorado
 Derby Dinner Playhouse – Clarksville, Indiana (since 1974)
 Desert Star Theater – Murray, Utah; listed on the U.S. National Register of Historic Places It was later closed down and demolished, but rebuilt and expanded into the Iris Theater. The Iris then changed hands several times before being renamed the Vista.
 The Dinner Detective – a nationwide theatrical production company based within the United States.
 Dolly Parton's Stampede – a chain of dinner theaters located in the United States that are owned by entertainer Dolly Parton and managed by World Choice Investments LLC, a joint venture between The Dollywood Company, Fred Hardwick, and Herschend Family Entertainment Corporation.
 Drury Lane Theatre – a suburban Chicago theatre group, the original of which operated as a dinner theatre from 1958 to 2003 before closing.
 Encore Dinner Theatre – Tustin, California
 Fireside Theatre – Fort Atkinson, Wisconsin
 Fulton Theatre – was located at West 46th Street in New York City for a few months in 1911 under the name Folies-Bergere; demolished
 Gaslight Theatre – Enid, Oklahoma
 Joy Swift's Original Murder Weekends – headquartered in Liverpool with shows in six cities across the United Kingdom
 La Comedia Dinner Theatre – Springboro, Ohio
 Laurie Beechman Theatre – in the basement of the West Bank Cafe at 407 West 42nd Street in the Manhattan Plaza apartment complex, just west of Times Square
 Medieval Times – chain of medieval-themed restaurants, featuring a tournament with sword-fighting and jousting
 The Mill at Sonning – converted from an 18th-century flour mill, it is located on an island in the River Thames at Sonning Eye in the English county of Oxfordshire
Murder Cafe – Hudson Valley, New York-based (formerly Las Vegas, Nevada) since 1998
New Theater Restaurant – Overland Park, Kansas
Pirates Dinner Adventures 
Pirates Voyage Dinner and Show – a dinner theater that features Blackbeard, a pirate with a history along the North and South Carolina coasts
Riverside Inn – Cambridge Springs, Crawford County, Pennsylvania; was listed on the U.S. National Register of Historic Places; destroyed by fire in 2017
 Roger Rocka's Dinner Theater – Fresno, California, dinner and a musical or play put on by the Good Company Players
 Showboat Dinner Theatre – St. Petersburg, Florida, a popular Tampa Bay venue in the 1970s–1980s, featuring popular stars of stage and screen, such as Dorothy Lamour, Hayden Rorke, Cesar Romero, and Myrna Loy 
 Stagedoor Dinner Theatre – Brisbane, Queensland, Australia
 Teatro ZinZanni – a circus dinner theater that began in the neighborhood of Lower Queen Anne in Seattle, Washington; expanded to a site on the waterfront at Pier 29 on The Embarcadero in San Francisco, California
 Toby's Dinner Theatre – Columbia, Maryland
 Way Off Broadway Dinner Theatre – Frederick, Maryland

See also

 Lists of restaurants
 Lists of theatres
 Madrigal dinner
 Mystery dinner
 Luau

References

 
Dinner theaters
Dinner theaters